Periyar (E. V. Ramasamy, 1879–1973) was a Tamil social reformer.

Periyar or Periyaar may also refer to:

Places
 Periyar River, in Kerala, India
 Periyar district, now Erode district, in Tamil Nadu, India
 Periyar National Park, in Kerala, India
 Mullaperiyar Dam, a dam in Idukki district, Kerala, India
 Vandiperiyar, a village in Idukki district, Kerala, India

People
 Periyar Dasan (1949–2013), actor from Tamil Nadu, India

Organisations
 Periyar Maniammai University, in Thanjavur, Tamil Nadu, India
 Periyar University, in Salem, Tamil Nadu, India

Media
 Periyar (1973 film), a Malayalam-language film
 Periyar (2007 film), a Tamil-language film
 Ramasamy Naicker (2010 film), a Telugu-language film

See also
 Periyar Dravidar Kazhagam, a former political party in Tamil Nadu, India